Jack, Jules, Esther and Me is a 2013 coming of age independent film directed by Daniel Poliner. This comedy centers on four young high schoolers on their last weekend before heading off to college and the scheme to win a girl's heart.  The film world premiered at Austin Film Festival where programmer Bears Fonté called it "an uplifting stumble through love in the time of awkward."

Cast

 Harrison Chad as Dougie
 Alexander Flores as Luis
 Alice Lee as Esther
 Jeff Lima as Carlos
 Jessica Rothenberg as Jules 
 Aaron Sauter as Jack

Release
Jack, Jules, Esther and Me was released on VOD by FilmBuff on December 17, 2013.  The Daily Quirk called the film "an irresistible romantic comedy that will tug at your heartstrings whether you’re a seasoned indie fan or a strictly mainstream movie spectator."  Greg Morris of The Word reviewed the film as "complex, intense, brilliant. It’s audacious humor reflects the sagacious wit of its director-writer."

Production notes
Writer/director Daniel Poliner financed the film through fees collected as an SAT prep tutor for privileged kids in New York City.  He said the movie is loosely based on his "most memorable students".

References

External links
 
 

American independent films
2013 films
2010s English-language films
2010s American films